Aufklärungsgruppe 121 (121st Reconnaissance Group) was a German Air Force air reconnaissance group that participated in the Axis-led invasion of Yugoslavia during World War II.

The group consisted of four Staffeln (squadron):
 1.(F)/121
 2.(F)/121
 3.(F)/121
 4.(F)/121

Notes

References
 

Luftwaffe Wings
Air force reconnaissance units and formations
Military units and formations disestablished in 1945